San Salvo is a comune and town in the Province of Chieti in the Abruzzo region of Italy. It is the last Abruzzo town on the Adriatic coast before entering the Molise Region.

San Salvo is divided into two major urban areas: San Salvo city and San Salvo Marina.

On the top of its seaside touristic and agricultural resources, San Salvo has a large industrial park which hosts glass-related business organizations.

Seaside 

The seaside of San Salvo, called San Salvo Marina, is characterized by long sandy beaches and shallow waters.

Festival and traditions 

Every year from 26 until 28 April, San Salvo hosts the "San Vitale Festival". It is a traditional city festival dedicated to the celebration of Saint Vitale. During these days several farmers donate durum wheat flour to the San Vitale church, all taking place during a folkloristic procession of decorated tractors. This flour is then being used for the production of traditional taralli and sagne pasta that is eventually distributed among the festival participants.

History 
San Salvo is a medieval name, probably of the 9th or 10th century. It is assumed that in Roman times in the area of San Salvo was located "The city of Buca." The extension of the Roman city was equivalent to at least four times that of the medieval town.

In the middle of the town, the archaeological area known as "il quadrilatero" is the place formerly used by the Cistercian abbey of Santi Vito e Salvo.

Points of interest 
 San Salvo Marina e Lungomare di San Salvo Marina
 Giardino Botanico Mediterraneo
 Il Portale di San Salvo CH :  eventi, webtv, foto, notizie, forum  
 SanSalvoInPiazza_UnaCittàGiovane

References

Cities and towns in Abruzzo
Coastal towns in Abruzzo